Lulwoidea is a genus of fungi within the Lulworthiaceae family. This is a monotypic genus, containing the single species Lulwoidea lignoarenaria.

References

External links

Lulworthiales
Monotypic Sordariomycetes genera